Zagrodniki may refer to:

Zagrodniki, Łódź Voivodeship (central Poland)
Zagrodniki, Lublin Voivodeship (east Poland)
Zagrodniki, Masovian Voivodeship (east-central Poland)